Sylvester Edward "Red" Davis (November 14, 1907 – August 5, 1988) was an American football tailback who played one season in the National Football League with the Portsmouth Spartans and Philadelphia Eagles. He played college football at Geneva College and attended Willard High School in Willard, Ohio.

References

External links
Just Sports Stats

1907 births
1988 deaths
Players of American football from Ohio
American football running backs
Geneva Golden Tornadoes football players
Portsmouth Spartans players
Philadelphia Eagles players